Jeremy Hyatt (born October 16, 1974) is retired American professional basketball player, who formerly played for the Newcastle Eagles in the British Basketball League.  He was a key player in the success of the Eagles, most notably the "clean sweep" of Championships in 2006.

Biography 
The 6′ 6′′ shooting guard attended North Carolina State University, and  signed for the Eagles in 2001. Noted and greatly respected for his perimeter shooting and his ability to defend out of position against forwards, Hyatt has also played France, Lebanon, and Central American in addition to the USBL for Raleigh Cougars (1997–1999), Washington Congressionals (2000), and Pennsylvania Valley Dawgs.

He is no longer married and does not live with his ex-wife and children in Raleigh, NC.

References 

1974 births
Living people
American men's basketball players
NC State Wolfpack men's basketball players
Newcastle Eagles players
Shooting guards